The Avro Vulcan (later Hawker Siddeley Vulcan from July 1963) is a jet-powered, tailless, delta-wing, high-altitude, strategic bomber, which was operated by the Royal Air Force (RAF) from 1956 until 1984. Aircraft manufacturer A.V. Roe and Company (Avro) designed the Vulcan in response to Specification B.35/46. Of the three V bombers produced, the Vulcan was considered the most technically advanced, hence the riskiest option. Several reduced-scale aircraft, designated Avro 707s, were produced to test and refine the delta-wing design principles.

The Vulcan B.1 was first delivered to the RAF in 1956; deliveries of the improved Vulcan B.2 started in 1960. The B.2 featured more powerful engines, a larger wing, an improved electrical system, and electronic countermeasures, and many were modified to accept the Blue Steel missile. As a part of the V-force, the Vulcan was the backbone of the United Kingdom's airborne nuclear deterrent during much of the Cold War. Although the Vulcan was typically armed with nuclear weapons, it could also carry out conventional bombing missions, which it did in Operation Black Buck during the Falklands War between the United Kingdom and Argentina in 1982.

The Vulcan had no defensive weaponry, initially relying upon high-speed, high-altitude flight to evade interception. Electronic countermeasures were employed by the B.1 (designated B.1A) and B.2 from around 1960. A change to low-level tactics was made in the mid-1960s. In the mid-1970s, nine Vulcans were adapted for maritime radar reconnaissance operations, redesignated as B.2 (MRR). In the final years of service, six Vulcans were converted to the K.2 tanker configuration for aerial refuelling.

After retirement by the RAF, one example, B.2 XH558, named The Spirit of Great Britain, was restored for use in display flights and air shows, whilst two other B.2s, XL426 and XM655, have been kept in taxiable condition for ground runs and demonstrations. B.2 XH558 flew for the last time in October 2015 and is also being kept in taxiable condition.

Development

Origins

The origin of the Vulcan and the other V bombers is linked with early British atomic weapon programme and nuclear deterrent policies. Britain's atom bomb programme began with Air Staff Operational Requirement OR.1001 issued in August 1946. This anticipated a government decision in January 1947 to authorise research and development work on atomic weapons, the U.S. Atomic Energy Act of 1946 (McMahon Act) having prohibited exporting atomic knowledge, even to countries that had collaborated on the Manhattan Project.

In January 1947, the Ministry of Supply distributed Specification B.35/46 to UK aviation companies to satisfy Air Staff Operational Requirement OR.229 for "a medium range bomber landplane capable of carrying one  bomb to a target  from a base which may be anywhere in the world." The maximum weight when fully loaded should not exceed . The similar OR.230 required a "long-range bomber" with a  radius of action with a maximum weight of  when fully loaded; this requirement was considered too exacting. Six companies submitted technical brochures to this specification, including Avro.

Required to tender by the end of April 1947, work began on receipt of Specification B.35/46 at Avro, led by technical director Roy Chadwick and chief designer Stuart Davies; the type designation was Avro 698. As was obvious to the design team, conventional aircraft could not satisfy the specification. No worthwhile information about high-speed flight was available from the Royal Aircraft Establishment (RAE) or the US. Avro were aware that Alexander Lippisch had designed a delta-wing fighter and considered the same delta configuration would be suitable for their bomber. The team estimated that an otherwise conventional aircraft, with a swept wing of 45°, would have doubled the weight requirement. Realising that swept wings increase longitudinal stability, the team deleted the tail (empennage) and the supporting fuselage, it thus became a swept-back flying wing with only a rudimentary forward fuselage and a fin (vertical stabilizer) at each wingtip. The estimated weight was now only 50% over the requirement; a delta shape resulted from reducing the wingspan and maintaining the wing area by filling in the space between the wingtips, which enabled the specification to be met. Although Alexander Lippisch is generally credited as the pioneer of the delta wing, Chadwick's team had followed its own logical design process. The initial design submission had four large turbojets stacked in pairs buried in the wings on either side of the centreline. Outboard of the engines were two bomb bays.

In August 1947, Chadwick was killed in the crash of the Avro Tudor 2 prototype, and was succeeded by Sir William Farren. Reductions in wing thickness made incorporating the split bomb bays and stacked engines impossible, thus the engines were placed side by side in pairs on either side of a single bomb bay, with the fuselage growing somewhat. The wingtip fins gave way to a single fin on the aircraft's centreline. Rival manufacturer Handley Page received a prototype contract for its crescent-winged HP.80 B.35/46 tender in November 1947. Although considered the best option, the contract award for Avro's design was delayed while its technical strength was established. Instructions to proceed with the construction of two Avro 698 prototypes were received in January 1948. As an insurance measure against both radical designs failing, Short Brothers received a contract for the prototype SA.4 to the less-stringent Specification B.14/46. The SA.4, later named Sperrin, was not required. In April 1948, Vickers also received authority to proceed with their Type 660, which, although falling short of the B.35/46 Specification, but being of a more conventional design, would be available sooner. This plane entered service as the Valiant.

Avro 707 and Avro 710

As Avro had no flight experience of the delta wing, the company planned two smaller experimental aircraft based on the 698, the one-third scale model 707 for low-speed handling and the one-half scale model 710 for high-speed handling. Two of each were ordered. The 710 was cancelled when it was considered too time-consuming to develop; a high-speed variant of the 707 was designed in its place, the 707A. The first 707, VX784, flew in September 1949, but crashed later that month, killing the Aeroplane and Armament Experimental Establishment's chief test pilot Squadron Leader Samuel Eric Esler, DFC, AE. The second low-speed 707, VX790, built with the still uncompleted 707A's nose section (containing an ejection seat) and redesignated 707B, flew in September 1950 piloted by Avro test pilot Wg Cdr Roland "Roly" Falk. The high-speed 707A, WD480, followed in July 1951.

Due to the delay of the 707 programme, the contribution of the 707B and 707A towards the basic design of the 698 was not considered significant, though it did highlight a need to increase the length of the nosewheel to give a ground incidence of 3.5°, the optimum take-off attitude. The 707B and 707A proved the design's validity and gave confidence in the delta planform. A second 707A, WZ736, and a two-seat 707C, WZ744, were also constructed, but they played no part in the 698's development.

Prototypes and type certification

First prototype VX770 and name

More influential than the Avro 707 in the 698's design was the wind-tunnel testing performed at RAE Farnborough. This necessitated a wing redesign incorporating a cranked and drooped leading edge and vortex generators to avoid the onset of compressibility drag, which would have restricted the maximum speed. This wing modification resulted in the "phase 2" wing which was first investigated on Avro 707A WD480. This modification was too late to be incorporated on the two prototype 698s and the first three B.1 aircraft before their first flights. (The B.1s were quickly retrofitted).

Painted gloss white, the 698 prototype VX770, with its pure delta wing, flew for the first time on 30 August 1952 piloted by Roly Falk flying solo. VX770, fitted with only the first pilot's ejection seat and a conventional control wheel, was powered by four Rolls-Royce RA.3 Avon engines of  thrust, its intended Bristol Olympus engines not being available. The prototype had fuselage fuel tanks but no wing tanks, so temporary additional tankage was carried in the bomb bay. VX770 made an appearance at the 1952 Society of British Aircraft Constructors' (SBAC) Farnborough Air Show the next month when Falk demonstrated an almost vertical bank. 

After its Farnborough appearance, the future name of the Avro 698 was a subject of speculation. Avro had strongly recommended the name Ottawa, in honour of the company's connection with Avro Canada. The weekly magazine Flight suggested Albion after rejecting Avenger, Apollo, and Assegai. The chief of the air staff preferred a V-class of bombers, and the Air Council announced the following month that the 698 would be called Vulcan after the Roman god of fire and destruction. 

In January 1953, VX770 was grounded for the installation of wing fuel tanks, Armstrong Siddeley ASSa.6 Sapphire engines of  thrust and other systems; it flew again in July 1953.

(From 1957, VX770 was used as the flying testbed for the Rolls-Royce Conway by-pass engine. It crashed at a flying display at RAF Syerston in September 1958.)

Second prototype VX777
The second prototype, VX777, first flew on 3 September 1953. More representative of production aircraft, it was lengthened to accommodate a longer nose undercarriage leg to increase the angle of attack of the wing, shortening the take-off run. It featured a visual bomb-aiming blister under the cabin and was fitted with Bristol Olympus 100 engines of  thrust. At Falk's suggestion, a fighter-style control stick had replaced the control wheel. Like VX770, VX777 had the original wing with straight leading edges. VX777 was joined in formation by the first prototype VX770 and four Avro 707s at the 1953 Farnborough Air Show. During trials in July 1954, VX777 was substantially damaged in a heavy landing at Farnborough. It was repaired, fitted with Olympus 101 engines of  thrust before resuming trials with Avro and the Aeroplane and Armament Experimental Establishment (A&AEE) at Boscombe Down.

Testing and type certification
While exploring VX777's high-speed and high-altitude flight envelope at the A&AEE, mild buffeting and other undesirable flight characteristics were experienced while approaching the limiting Mach number, including an alarming tendency to enter an uncontrollable dive. This was judged unacceptable for an unarmed bomber. Fitting the phase 2 wing removed the buffeting and an auto-mach trimmer countered the high-speed dive. The latter applied up-elevator as the speed critically increased. This up-elevator force was greater than the force required to counter the dive. Consequently, as speed increased, the control column had to be pushed rather than pulled to maintain level flight. This artificial pitch-up made the Vulcan handle more like other aircraft as its speed increased.

The first production B.1 XA889 first flew in February 1955 with the original wing and joined the trials in June. In September 1955, Falk, flying the second production B.1 XA890 (which had remained at Woodford as part of the MoS's Air Fleet on radio trials), amazed crowds at the Farnborough Air Show by executing a barrel roll on his second flypast in front of the SBAC president's tent. After two days of flying, he was called in front of service and civil aviation authorities and ordered to refrain from carrying out this "dangerous" manoeuvre. Now fitted with a phase 2 wing, XA889 was delivered in March 1956 to the A&AEE for trials for the type's initial Certificate of Airworthiness which it received the following month.

(In 1956, VX777 was modified with the even larger phase 2(C) wing. Fitted with Olympus 104 engines, it became the aerodynamic prototype of the Vulcan B.2.)

Into service

Vulcan B.1 and B1A
The first 15 production B.1s were powered by the Olympus 101. Many of these early examples in a metallic finish remained the property of the Ministry of Supply, being retained for trials and development purposes. Those entering RAF service were delivered to No 230 Operational Conversion Unit (OCU), the first in July 1956. Later aircraft, painted in anti-flash white and powered by the Olympus 102 with  thrust, began to enter squadron service in July 1957. The Olympus 102s were modified during overhaul to the Olympus 104 standard, ultimately rated at  thrust.

Rebuilding B.1s as B.2s was considered but rejected over cost. Nevertheless, to extend the B.1's service life, 28 (the surviving B1 aircraft fitted with Olympus 102/104 engines) were upgraded by Armstrong Whitworth between 1959 and 1963 to the B.1A standard, including features of the B.2 such as ECM equipment, in-flight refuelling receiving equipment, and UHF radio.  However, the B.1As were not strengthened for low-level operations and all were withdrawn by 1968.

Vulcan B.2
As far back as 1952, Bristol Aero Engines had begun development of the BOl.6 (Olympus 6) rated at  thrust but if fitted to the B.1, this would have reintroduced the buffet requiring further redesign of the wing.

The decision to proceed with the B.2 versions of the Vulcan was made in May 1956, being developed by Avro's chief designer Roy Ewans. The first B.2 was anticipated to be around the 45th aircraft of the 99 then on order. As well as being able to achieve greater heights over targets, operational flexibility was believed to be extended by the provision of in-flight refuelling equipment and tanker aircraft. The increasing sophistication of Soviet air defences required the fitting of electronic countermeasure (ECM) equipment, and vulnerability could be reduced by the introduction of the Avro Blue Steel stand-off missile, then in development. To develop these proposals, the second Vulcan prototype VX777 was rebuilt with the larger and thinner phase-2C wing, improved flying control surfaces, and Olympus 102 engines, first flying in this configuration in August 1957. Several Vulcan B.1s were used for the development of the B.2: development of the BOl.6 (later Olympus 200), XA891; a new AC electrical system, XA893; ECM including jammers within a bulged tail cone and a tail warning radar, XA895: and for Blue Steel development work, XA903.

The 46th production aircraft and first B.2, XH533, first flew in September 1958 using Olympus 200 engines, six months before the last B.1 XH532 was delivered in March 1959. The second B.2, XH534, flew in January 1959. Powered by production Olympus 201s with  thrust, it was more representative of a production aircraft, being fitted with an in-flight refuelling probe and a bulged ECM tail cone. Some subsequent B.2s were initially lacking probes and ECM tail cones, but these were retrofitted. The first 10 B.2s outwardly showed their B.1 ancestry, retaining narrow engine air intakes. Anticipating even more powerful engines, the air intakes were deepened on the 11th (XH557) and subsequent aircraft. Many of the early aircraft were retained for trials, and the 12th B.2, XH558, was the first to be delivered to the RAF in July 1960. Coincidentally, XH558 was also the last Vulcan in service with the RAF, before being retired in 1992.

The 26th B.2, XL317, the first of a production batch ordered in February 1956, was the first Vulcan, apart from development aircraft, capable of carrying the Blue Steel missile; 33 aircraft were delivered to the RAF with these modifications. When the Mk.2 version of Blue Steel was cancelled in favour of the Douglas GAM-87 Skybolt air-launched ballistic missile in December 1959, fittings were changed in anticipation of the new missile, one under each wing. Though Skybolt was cancelled in November 1962, many aircraft were delivered or retrofitted with "Skybolt" blisters. Later aircraft were delivered with Olympus 301 engines with  thrust. Two earlier aircraft were re-engined (XH557 and XJ784) for trials and development work; another seven aircraft were converted around 1963.

The last B.2 XM657 was delivered in 1965 and the type served until 1984. Whilst in service, the B.2 was continuously updated with modifications, including rapid engine starting, bomb-bay fuel tanks, wing strengthening to give the fatigue life to enable the aircraft to fly at low level (a tactic introduced in the mid-1960s), upgraded navigation equipment, terrain-following radar, standardisation on a common weapon (WE.177) and improved ECM equipment. Nine B.2s were modified for a maritime radar reconnaissance  role and six for an airborne tanker role. An updated bomb rack assembly allowing the carriage of 30 1,000 lb bombs, up from 21 was demonstrated by Avro but was not introduced. The updated wing profile increased range to 4,000 nm (7,400 km).

Proposed developments and cancelled projects
Avro Type 718
The Avro 718 was a 1951 proposal for a delta-winged military transport based on the Type 698 to carry 80 troops or 110 passengers. It would have been powered by four Bristol Olympus BOl.3 engines.
Avro Atlantic

The Avro Type 722 Atlantic was a 1952 proposal (announced in June 1953) for a 120-passenger delta-winged airliner based on the Type 698.
Avro Type 732
The Avro 732 was a 1956 proposal for a supersonic development of the Vulcan and would have been powered by 8 de Havilland Gyron Junior engines. Unlike the proposed Avro 721 low-level bomber of 1952 or the Avro 730 supersonic stainless steel canard bomber dating from 1954 (cancelled in 1957 before completion of the prototype), the Type 732 showed its Vulcan heritage.
Vulcan Phase 6 (Vulcan B.3)

In 1960, the Air Staff approached Avro with a request into a study for a patrol missile carrier armed with up to six Skybolt missiles capable of a mission length of 12 hours. Avro's submission in May 1960 was the Phase 6 Vulcan, which would have been the Vulcan B.3. An amended proposal of October 1960 inserted a  plug into the forward fuselage with capacity for six crew members including a relief pilot, all facing forwards on ejection seats, and aft-fan versions of the Olympus 301.

Export proposals
Other countries expressed interest in purchasing Vulcans, but as with the other V-bombers, no foreign sales materialised.

Australia
As early as 1954, the Royal Australian Air Force (RAAF) recognised that the English Electric Canberra might soon become outdated. Potential replacements, such as the Boeing B-47E, Handley-Page Victor and Vulcan were considered. 

Political pressure for a Canberra replacement came to a head in 1962, by which time agile, supersonic bombers/strategic strike aircraft, such as the North American A-5 Vigilante, BAC TSR-2, General Dynamics F-111, had become available. Had the Australian government pre-ordered the TSR-2, several V-bombers, including Vulcans, would have been made available, for interim use by the RAAF; however, the F-111C was ordered. (The UK government almost followed that decision – after the cancellation of the TSR-2 – it was offered the similar F-111K.)

Argentina
In the early 1980s, Argentina approached the UK with a proposal to buy a number of Vulcans. An application, made in September 1981, requested the 'early availability' of a 'suitable aircraft'. With some reluctance, British ministers approved the export of a single aircraft but emphasised that clearance had not been given for the sale of a larger number. A letter from the British Foreign and Commonwealth Office to the Ministry of Defence in January 1982 stated that little prospect was seen of this happening without ascertaining the Argentine interest and whether such interest was genuine: 'On the face of it, a strike aircraft would be entirely suitable for an attack on the Falklands.' Argentina invaded the Falkland Islands less than three months later, after which a British embargo on the sale of any military equipment was quickly imposed.

Design

Overview
Despite its radical and unusual shape, the airframe was built along traditional lines. Except for the most highly stressed parts, the whole structure was manufactured from standard grades of light alloy. The airframe was broken down into a number of major assemblies: The centre section, a rectangular box containing the bomb bay and engine bays bounded by the front and rear spars and the wing transport joints; the intakes and centre fuselage; the front fuselage, incorporating the pressure cabin; the nose; the outer wings; the leading edges; the wing trailing edge and rear end of the fuselage; and a single swept tail fin with a single rudder was on the trailing edge.

A five-man crew was accommodated within the pressure cabin on two levels; the first pilot and co-pilot sitting on Martin-Baker 3K (3KS on the B.2) ejection seats whilst on the lower level the navigator radar, navigator plotter, and air electronics officer (AEO) sat facing rearwards and would abandon the aircraft via the entrance door. The original B35/46 specification sought a jettisonable crew compartment, but this requirement was removed in a subsequent amendment; the rear crew's escape system was often an issue of controversy, such as when a practical refit scheme was rejected. A rudimentary sixth seat forward of the navigator radar was provided for an additional crew member; the B.2 had an additional seventh seat opposite the sixth seat and forward of the AEO. The visual bomb-aimer's compartment could be fitted with a T4 (Blue Devil) bombsight, in many B.2s, this space housed a vertically mounted Vinten F95 Mk.10 camera for assessing simulated low-level bombing runs.

Fuel was carried in 14 bag tanks, four in the centre fuselage above and to the rear of the nosewheel bay, and five in each outer wing. The tanks were split into four groups of almost equal capacity, each normally feeding its respective engine, though cross-feeding was possible. The centre of gravity was automatically maintained by electric timers, which sequenced the booster pumps on the tanks. B.2 aircraft could be fitted with one or two additional fuel tanks in the bomb bay.

Despite being designed before a low radar cross-section  and other stealth factors were ever a consideration, an RAE technical note of 1957 stated that of all the aircraft so far studied, the Vulcan appeared by far the simplest radar-echoing object, due to its shape; only one or two components contributed significantly to the echo at any aspect, compared with three or more on most other types.

Colour schemes

The two prototype Vulcans were finished in gloss white. Early Vulcan B.1s left the factory in a natural metal finish; the front half of the nose radome was painted black, the rear half painted silver. Front-line Vulcan B.1s had a finish of anti-flash white and RAF "type D" roundels. Front-line Vulcan B.1As and B.2s were similar, but with pale roundels.

With the adoption of low-level attack profiles in the mid-1960s, B.1As and B.2s were given a glossy sea grey medium and dark green disruptive pattern camouflage on the upper surfaces, white undersurfaces, and "type D" roundels. (The last 13 Vulcan B.2s, XM645 onwards, were delivered thus from the factory). In the mid-1970s, Vulcan B.2s received a similar scheme with matte camouflage, light aircraft grey undersides, and "low-visibility" roundels. B.2(MRR)s received a similar scheme in gloss; and the front halves of the radomes were no longer painted black. Beginning in 1979, 10 Vulcans received a wrap-around camouflage of dark sea grey and dark green because, during Red Flag exercises in the US, defending SAM forces had found that the grey-painted undersides of the Vulcan became much more visible against the ground at high angles of bank.

Avionics
The original Vulcan B.1 radio fit was: two 10-channel VHF transmitter/receivers (TR-1985/TR-1986) and a 24-channel HF transmitter-receiver (STR-18). The Vulcan B.1A also featured a UHF transmitter-receiver (ARC-52). The initial B.2 radio fit was similar to the B.1A though it was ultimately fitted with the ARC-52, a V/UHF transmitter/receiver (PTR-175), and a single-sideband modulation HF transmitter-receiver (Collins 618T).

The navigation and bombing system  comprised an H2S Mk9 radar and a navigation bombing computer Mk1. Other navigation aids included a Marconi radio compass (ADF), GEE Mk3, Green Satin Doppler radar to determine the groundspeed and drift angle, radio and radar altimeters, and an instrument landing system. TACAN replaced GEE in the B.1A and B.2 in 1964. Decca Doppler 72 replaced Green Satin in the B.2 around 1969 A continuous display of the aircraft's position was maintained by a ground position indicator.

Vulcan B.2s were eventually fitted with the free-running dual-gyroscopic heading reference system (HRS) Mk.2, based upon the inertial platform of the Blue Steel missile, which had been integrated into the system when the missile had been carried. With the HRS a navigator's heading unit was provided, which enabled the navigator plotter to adjust the aircraft heading, through the autopilot, by as little as 0.1 degrees. The B.2 (MRR) was additionally fitted with the LORAN C navigation system.

The original ECM fit of the B.1A and B.2 was one Green Palm voice communications jammer; two Blue Diver metric jammers; three Red Shrimp S-band jammers; a Blue Saga passive warning receiver with four aerials; a Red Steer tail warning radar; and chaff dispensers. The bulk of the equipment was carried in a large, extended tail cone, and a flat ECM aerial counterpoise plate was mounted between the starboard tailpipes. Later equipment on the B.2 included: an L band jammer (replacing a Red Shrimp); the ARI 18146 X-band jammer; replacing the Green Palm; the improved Red Steer Mk.2; infra-red decoys (flares); and the ARI 18228 PWR with its aerials that gave a squared top to the fin.

Controls

The aircraft was controlled by a fighter-type control stick and rudder bar, which operated the powered flying controls, which each had a single electrohydraulic-powered flying control unit, except the rudder, which had two, one running as a back-up. Artificial feel and auto stabilisation in the form of pitch and yaw dampers were provided, as well as an auto Mach trimmer.

The flight instruments in the B.1 were traditional and included G4B compasses; Mk.4 artificial horizons; and zero reader flight display instruments. The B.1 had a Smiths Mk10 autopilot. In the B.2, these features were incorporated into the Smiths Military Flight System (MFS), the pilots' components being: two beam compasses; two director-horizons; and an Mk.10A or Mk.10B autopilot. From 1966, B.2s were fitted with the ARI 5959  TFR, built by General Dynamics, its commands being fed into the director-horizons.

The B.1 had four elevators (inboard) and four ailerons (outboard). In the B.2, these were replaced by eight elevons. The Vulcan was also fitted with six electrically operated three-position (retracted, medium drag, high drag) airbrakes, four in the upper centre section and two in the lower. Originally, four lower airbrakes were used, but the outboard two were deleted before the aircraft entered service. A brake parachute was installed inside the tail cone.

Electrical and hydraulic systems
The main electrical system on the B.1/B.1A was 112 V DC supplied by four 22.5kW engine-driven starter-generators. Backup power was provided by four 24 V 40 Ah batteries connected in series providing 96 V. Secondary electrical systems were 28 V DC, single-phase 115 V AC at 1600 Hz, and three-phase 115 V AC at 400 Hz, driven by transformers and inverters from the main system. The 28 V DC system was backed up by a single 24 V battery.

For greater efficiency and higher reliability, the main system on the B.2 was changed to three-phase 200 V AC at 400 Hz supplied by four 40 kVA engine-driven constant-speed alternators. Engine starting was then by air-starters supplied from a Palouste compressor on the ground. Secondary electrical supplies were by transformer-rectifier units for 28 V DC and rotary frequency converters for the 115 V 1600 Hz single-phase supplies.

The change to an AC system was a significant improvement. Each PFCU had a hydraulic pump that was driven by an electric motor, in modern terminology, this is an electro-hydraulic actuator. Because no manual reversion existed, a total electrical failure would result in a loss of control. The standby batteries on the B.1 were designed to give enough power for 20 minutes of flying time, but this proved to be optimistic and two aircraft, XA891 and XA908, crashed as a result.

The main hydraulic system provided pressure for undercarriage raising and lowering and bogie trim; nosewheel centring and steering; wheel brakes (fitted with Maxarets); bomb doors opening and closing; and (B.2 only) AAPP air scoop lowering. Hydraulic pressure was provided by three hydraulic pumps fitted to Nos. 1, 2 and 3 engines. An electrically operated hydraulic power pack (EHPP) could be used to operate the bomb doors and recharge the brake accumulators. A compressed air (later nitrogen) system was provided for emergency undercarriage lowering.

Engine

The Rolls-Royce Olympus, originally known as the "Bristol BE.10 Olympus", is a two-spool, axial-flow turbojet that powered the Vulcan. Each Vulcan had four engines buried in the wings, positioned in pairs close to the fuselage. The engine's design began in 1947, intended to power the Bristol Aeroplane Company's own rival design to the Vulcan.

As the prototype Vulcan VX770 was ready for flight prior to the Olympus being available, it first flew using Rolls-Royce Avon RA.3 engines of  thrust. These were quickly replaced by Armstrong Siddeley Sapphire ASSa.6 engines of  thrust. VX770 later became a flying test bed for the Rolls-Royce Conway. The second prototype VX777 first flew with Olympus 100s of  thrust. It was subsequently re-engined with Olympus 101 engines. When VX777 flew with a Phase 2C (B.2) wing in 1957, it was fitted with Olympus 102 engines of  thrust.

Early B.1s were equipped with the Olympus 101. Later aircraft were delivered with Olympus 102s. All Olympus 102s became the Olympus 104 on overhaul and ultimately  thrust on uprating. The first B.2 flew with the second-generation Olympus 200, design of which began in 1952. Subsequent B.2s were engined with either the uprated Olympus 201 or the Olympus 301. The Olympus 201 was designated 202 on being fitted with a rapid air starter. The engine would later be developed into a reheated (afterburning) powerplant for the cancelled TSR-2 strike/reconnaissance aircraft and the supersonic passenger transport Concorde.

Around 90% power, the engines in the Vulcan would emit a distinctive "howl"-like noise  due to the air intake arrangement, which became an attraction at public airshows.

Operational history

Introduction
In September 1956, the RAF received its first Vulcan B.1, XA897, which immediately embarked upon a round-the-world tour. The tour was to be an important demonstration of the range and capabilities of the aircraft, but it also had other benefits in the form of conducting goodwill visits in various countries; during their service, Vulcans routinely visited various nations and distant parts of the Commonwealth as a show of support and military protection. This first tour, however, was struck by misfortune; on 1 October 1956, while landing in bad weather at London Heathrow Airport at the completion of the world tour, XA897 was destroyed in a fatal accident.

The first two aircraft were delivered to 230 OCU in January 1957 and the training of crews started on 21 February 1957. The first OCU course to qualify was No. 1 Course, on 21 May 1957, and they went on to form the first flight of No. 83 Squadron. No. 83 Squadron was the first operational squadron to use the bomber, at first using borrowed Vulcans from the OCU, and on 11 July 1956 it received the first aircraft of its own. By September 1957, several Vulcans had been handed over to No. 83 Squadron. The second OCU course also formed a Flight of 83 Squadron, but subsequent trained crews were also used to form the second bomber squadron, 101 Squadron. The last aircraft from the first batch of 25 aircraft had been delivered by the end of 1957 to 101 Squadron.

To increase the mission range and flight time for Vulcan operations, in-flight refuelling capabilities were added from 1959 onwards; several Valiant bombers were refurbished as tankers to refuel the Vulcans. Continuous airborne patrols proved untenable, however, and the refuelling mechanisms across the Vulcan fleet fell into disuse in the 1960s. Both Vulcans and the other V-force aircraft routinely visited the Far East, in particular Singapore, where a fully equipped nuclear-weapons storage facility had been constructed in 1959. These deployments were part of the UK's contribution to SEATO operations, often to test the defences of friendly nations in joint exercises. During the Indonesia–Malaysia confrontation, Britain planned to deploy three squadrons of V-bomber aircraft and 48 Red Beard tactical nuclear weapons to the region, although this was ultimately decided against. Vulcans trained in the region for both conventional and nuclear missions. In the early 1970s, the RAF decided to permanently deploy two squadrons of Vulcans overseas in the Near East Air Force Bomber Wing, based at RAF Akrotiri in Cyprus. The Vulcans were withdrawn in the mid-1970s, however, as Cypriot intercommunal violence intensified.

Vulcans flew some very long-range missions. In June 1961, one flew 18,507 km from RAF Scampton to Sydney in just over 20 hours, facilitated by three air refuellings. Vulcans frequently visited the United States during the 1960s and 1970s to participate in air shows and static displays, as well as to participate in the Strategic Air Command's (SAC) Annual Bombing and Navigation Competition at such locations as Barksdale AFB, Louisiana, and the former McCoy AFB, Florida. Vulcans also took part Operation Skyshield exercises in 1960, 1961, and 1962, in which NORAD defences were tested against possible Soviet air attack, the Vulcans simulating Soviet fighter/bomber attacks against New York, Chicago, and Washington, DC. The results of the tests were classified until 1997. The Vulcan proved quite successful during the 1974 "Giant Voice" exercise, in which it managed to avoid USAF interceptors.

Nuclear deterrent
As part of Britain's independent nuclear deterrent, the Vulcan initially carried Britain's first nuclear weapon, the Blue Danube gravity bomb. Blue Danube was a low-kiloton yield fission bomb designed before the United States detonated the first hydrogen bomb. These were supplemented by U.S.-owned Mk 5 bombs (made available under the Project E programme) and later by the British Red Beard tactical nuclear weapon. The UK had already embarked on its own hydrogen bomb programme, and to bridge the gap until these were ready the V-bombers were equipped with an Interim Megaton Weapon based on the Blue Danube casing containing Green Grass, a large pure-fission warhead of  yield. This bomb was known as Violet Club. Only five were deployed before the Green Grass warhead was incorporated into a developed weapon as Yellow Sun Mk.1.

The later Yellow Sun Mk 2, was fitted with Red Snow, a British-built variant of the U.S. W28 warhead. Yellow Sun Mk 2 was the first British thermonuclear weapon to be deployed, and was carried on both the Vulcan and Handley Page Victor. The Valiant retained U.S. nuclear weapons assigned to SACEUR under the dual-key arrangements. Red Beard was positioned in Singapore for use by Vulcan and Victor bombers. From 1962, three squadrons of Vulcan B.2s and two squadrons of Victor B.2s were armed with the Blue Steel missile, a rocket-powered stand-off bomb, which was also fitted with the  yield Red Snow warhead.

Operationally, RAF Bomber Command and the SAC cooperated in the Single Integrated Operational Plan  to ensure coverage of all major Soviet targets from 1958; 108 of the RAF's V-bombers were assigned targets under the plan by the end of 1959. From 1962 onwards, two jets in every RAF bomber base were armed with nuclear weapons and on standby permanently under the principle of Quick Reaction Alert (QRA). Vulcans on QRA were to be airborne within four minutes of receiving an alert, as this was identified as the amount of time between warning of a USSR nuclear strike being launched and it arriving in Britain. The closest the Vulcan came to taking part in potential nuclear conflict was during the Cuban Missile Crisis in October 1962, where Bomber Command was moved to Alert Condition 3, an increased state of preparedness from normal operations; however, it stood down in early November.

The Vulcans were intended to be equipped with the Skybolt missile to replace the Blue Steel, with Vulcan B.2s carrying two Skybolts under the wings. The last 28 B.2s were modified on the production line to fit pylons to carry the Skybolt. A B.3 variant with increased wingspan to carry up to six Skybolts was proposed in 1960. When the Skybolt missile system was cancelled by U.S. President John F. Kennedy on the recommendation of his Secretary of Defense, Robert McNamara in 1962, precipitating the Skybolt Crisis, Blue Steel was retained. To supplement it until the Royal Navy took on the deterrent role with Polaris SLBM-equipped submarines, the Vulcan bombers adopted a new mission profile of flying high during clear transit, dropping down low to avoid enemy defences on approach, and deploying a parachute-retarded bomb, the WE.177B. However, since the aircraft had been designed for high-altitude flight, at low altitudes it could not exceed 350 knots. RAF Air Vice Marshal Ron Dick, a former Vulcan pilot, said "it is [thus] questionable whether it could have been effective flying at low level in a war against ... the Soviet Union."

After the British Polaris submarines became operational and Blue Steel was taken out of service in 1970, the Vulcan continued to carry WE.177B in a tactical nuclear strike role as part of the British contribution to Europe's standing NATO forces, although they no longer held aircraft at 15 minutes' readiness in peacetime. Two squadrons were also stationed in Cyprus as part of the Near East Air Force and assigned to Central Treaty Organization in a strategic strike role. With the eventual demise of the WE.177B and the Vulcan bombers, the Blackburn Buccaneer, SEPECAT Jaguar, and Panavia Tornado continued with the WE.177C until its retirement in 1998. While not a like-for-like replacement, the multi-role Tornado interdictor/strike bomber is the successor for the roles previously filled by the Vulcan.

Conventional role

Although in operational use, the Vulcan typically carried various nuclear armaments, the type also had a secondary conventional role. While performing conventional combat missions, the Vulcan could carry up to 21  bombs inside its bomb bay. From the 1960s, the various Vulcan squadrons routinely conducted conventional training missions; the aircrews were expected to be able to perform conventional bombing missions, in addition to the critical nuclear strike mission.

The Vulcan's only combat missions took place towards the end of the type's service in 1982. During the Falklands War, the Vulcan was deployed against Argentinian forces which had occupied the Falkland Islands. The missions performed by the Vulcan became known as the Black Buck raids, each aircraft had to fly  from Ascension Island to reach Stanley on the Falklands.

Engineering work to prepare the five Vulcans that would conduct the missions began on 9 April. Each aircraft required modifications to the bomb bay, the reinstatement of the long out-of-use in-flight refuelling system, the installation of a new navigational system derived from the Vickers VC10, and the updating of several onboard electronics. Underneath the wings, new pylons were fitted to carry an ECM pod and Shrike antiradar missiles at wing hardpoint locations.

On 1 May, the first mission was conducted by a single Vulcan (XM607) that flew over Port Stanley and dropped its bombs on the airfield, concentrating on the single runway, with one direct hit, making it unsuitable for fighter aircraft. The Vulcan's mission was quickly followed up by strikes against anti-air installations, flown by British Aerospace Sea Harriers from Royal Navy aircraft carriers. A further two missions saw missiles launched against radar installations and two additional missions were cancelled. At the time, these missions held the record for the world's longest-distance raids. The Vulcans' ECM systems proved to be effective at jamming Argentine radars; while a Vulcan was within the theatre, other British aircraft in the vicinity had a reduced chance of coming under effective fire.

On 3 June 1982, Vulcan B.2 XM597 of No. 50 Squadron took part in the "Black Buck 6" mission against Argentinian radar sites at Stanley airfield on the Falkland Islands. While attempting to refuel for its return journey to Ascension Island, the probe broke, leaving the Vulcan with insufficient fuel, forcing a diversion to Galeão Air Force Base, Rio de Janeiro, in neutral Brazil. En route, secret papers were dumped along with the two remaining AGM-45 Shrike missiles, although one failed to launch. After a mayday call, the Vulcan, escorted by Brazilian Air Force Northrop F-5 fighters, was permitted an emergency landing at Rio with very little fuel left on board. The Vulcan and her crew were detained until the end of hostilities nine days later.

Reconnaissance
In November 1973, as a result of the planned closure of the Victor SR.2 equipped No. 543 Squadron, No. 27 Squadron reformed at RAF Scampton equipped with the Vulcan as a replacement in the maritime radar reconnaissance role. The squadron carried out patrols of the seas around the British Isles, including the strategically important GIUK gap between Iceland and the United Kingdom, flying at high level and using the Vulcan's H2S radar to monitor shipping. In peacetime, this could be followed up by visual identification and photography of targets of interest at low level. In the event of war, a Vulcan would leave visual identification of potential targets to Buccaneers or Canberras and could coordinate attacks by Buccaneers against hostile shipping. Though initially equipped with a number of B.2 aircraft, the Squadron eventually operated nine B.2 (MRR) aircraft (also known by the unofficial designation SR.2). The aircraft were modified for the role by removing the TFR (and its thimble radome) and adding the LORAN C radio navigation aid. The main external visual difference was the presence of a gloss paint finish, with a light grey undersurface, to protect against sea spray.

The squadron also inherited its secondary role of air sampling from No. 543 Squadron. This involved flying through plumes of airborne contamination and using onboard equipment to collect fallout released from both above ground and underground nuclear tests for later analysis at the Atomic Weapons Research Establishment at Aldermaston. Five aircraft had small pylons fitted to the redundant Skybolt hardpoints, which could be used to carry sampling pods modified from drop tanks. These pods would collect the needed samples on a filter, while an additional smaller "localiser" pod was fitted to the port wing, inboard of the main pylons.

The squadron disbanded at Scampton in March 1982, passing on its radar reconnaissance duties to the RAF's Nimrods.

Aerial refuelling role
After the end of the Falklands War in 1982, the Vulcan B.2 was due to be withdrawn from RAF service that year. The Falklands campaign, however, had consumed much of the airframe fatigue life of the RAF's Victor tankers. While Vickers VC10 tanker conversions had been ordered in 1979 and Lockheed TriStar tankers would be ordered after the conflict, as a stopgap measure six Vulcans were converted into single-point tankers. The Vulcan tanker conversion was accomplished by removing the jammers from the ECM bay in the tail of the aircraft and replacing them with a single hose drum unit. An additional cylindrical bomb-bay tank was fitted, giving a fuel capacity of almost .

The go-ahead for converting the six aircraft was given on 4 May 1982. Just 50 days after being ordered, the first Vulcan tanker, XH561, was delivered to RAF Waddington. The Vulcan K.2s were operated by No. 50 Squadron, along with three Vulcan B.2s, in support of UK air defence activities until it was disbanded in March 1984.

Vulcan Display Flight

After the disbandment of No. 50 Squadron, two Vulcans continued flying with the RAF in air displays as part of the Vulcan Display Flight, based at Waddington but administered through No. 55 Squadron, based at RAF Marham. Initially displaying using XL426, in 1986 that aircraft was sold, having been replaced by XH558, which began displays in 1985. The VDF continued with XH558 until 1992, finishing operations after the Ministry of Defence determined it was too costly to run in light of budget cuts. Both aircraft subsequently entered preservation and survived, although a third, XH560, kept in reserve in the first years, was later scrapped.

Engine test beds
 The first prototype VX770 had its Sapphire engines replaced with four  Rolls-Royce Conway RCo.7 turbofans in 1957. It was transferred to Rolls-Royce as the Conway test bed. It flew with the Conways, the first turbofans in the world, until its fatal crash in September 1958.
 The first Vulcan B.1 XA889 was used for the flight clearances of the Olympus 102 and 104.
 Vulcan B.1 XA891 was fitted with four Olympus 200 engines in the spring of 1958 for intensive flying trials. The aircraft crashed in July 1958 during a routine test flight.
 Vulcan B.1 XA894 flew with five Olympus engines, the standard four Mk.101s, plus a reheated Olympus 320 destined for the BAC TSR-2 in an underslung nacelle. This aircraft was destroyed in a ground fire at Filton on 3 December 1962.
 Vulcan B.1 XA896 was withdrawn from RAF service in June 1964 and transferred to be converted to the test bed for the Bristol Siddeley BS100 vectored thrust turbofan for the Hawker Siddeley P.1154. The P.1154 was cancelled in February 1965 and XA896 was scrapped before being converted.
 Vulcan B.1 XA902 was withdrawn from RAF service after a landing accident in 1958. After rebuilding, it replaced VX770 as the Conway test bed, fitted with four RCo.11s. The two inner Conways were replaced with Rolls-Royce Speys, flying for the first time in this configuration on 12 October 1961.
 Vulcan B.1 XA903, surplus to Blue Steel trials, was converted to a similar layout to XA894 to flight test the Olympus 593 Concorde installation. The first flight was on 1 October 1966 and testing continued through to June 1971. In April 1973, XA903 started flying with an underslung Rolls-Royce RB.199 turbofan destined for the Panavia Tornado. XA903 was the last B.1 to fly, being retired in February 1979.
 Vulcan B.2 XH557 was used by BSEL for developing the Olympus 301 and first flew with the larger engine in May 1961. It was returned to Woodford in 1964 to be refurbished for the RAF.

Variants

B.1
The initial production aircraft. The first few had straight leading edges, later retrofitted with phase 2 (kinked) wings. Early examples were finished in silver, later changed to "anti-flash" white. Many were converted to B.1A standard 1959–1963. The last few unmodified B.1s in RAF service with No. 230 OCU retired by 1966. Last flight by any B.1, an engine testbed XA903, March 1979.

B.1A
The B.1 with an ECM system in a new larger tail cone (as in B.2). Unlike the B.2, the B.1As did not undergo extensive wing strengthening for low-level flying and were withdrawn from service 1966–67.

B.2
Developed version of the B.1. Larger, thinner wing than the B.1 (Phase 2C wing) and fitted with Olympus 201-202 engines, or Olympus 301 engines. Uprated electrics with AAPP and Ram Air Turbine (RAT). ECM similar to B.1A. TFR in nose thimble radome fitted to most aircraft in the mid-60s. New Radar warning receiver aerials on tail fin giving it a square top from the mid-1970s.

B.2 (MRR)
Nine B.2s converted to maritime radar reconnaissance (MRR). TFR deleted. Five aircraft were further modified for the air sampling role. Distinctive gloss finish with light grey underside.

K.2
Six B.2s converted for air-to-air refuelling with Mark 17 hose drum unit (HDU) mounted semi-recessed in the tail cone. TFR deleted. Fitted with three bomb-bay drum tanks, it was the only mark of Vulcan that could jettison fuel in an emergency.

B.3
Proposed version, intended as a long-endurance missile carrier capable of carrying up to six Skybolt missiles on flights of up to 12 hours duration. Never built.

Production
A total of 134 production Vulcans were assembled at Woodford Aerodrome, 45 to the B.1 design and 89 were B.2 models, the last being delivered to the RAF in January 1965.

Operators

 Aeroplane and Armament Experimental Establishment aircraft used for trials and evaluation
 Royal Air Force
 9 squadron (B.2 from 1962 to 1982)
 12 squadron (B.2 from 1962 to 1967)
 27 squadron (B.2 from 1961 to 1972 and the B.2 (MRR) from 1973 to 1982)
 35 squadron (B.2 from 1962 to 1982)
 44 squadron (B.1/B.1A from 1960 to 1967 and the B.2 from 1966 to 1982)
 50 squadron (B.1/B.1A from 1961 to 1966, the B.2 from 1966 to 1984 and the K.2 from 1982 to 1984)
 83 squadron (the first Vulcan squadron operated the B.1/B.1A from 1957 to 1960 and the B.2 from 1960 to 1969)
 101 squadron (B.1/B1A from 1957 to 1967 and the B.2 from 1967 to 1982)
 617 squadron (OB.1/B1A from 1958 to 1961 and the B.2 from 1961 to 1981)
 230 OCU from 1956 to 1981. The first unit to operate the Vulcan, it provided conversion and operational training for Vulcan aircrew
 Bomber Command Development Unit
 Vulcan To The Sky Trust (G-VLCN, formerly XH558, flying until 2015) based at Doncaster Sheffield Airport) until June 2023
 Aircraft were also operated at various times under the direction of the Ministry of Supply/Aviation for trials and evaluation by Avro, Bristol Siddeley Engines, Rolls-Royce and the Blind Landing Experimental Unit (BLEU)

Bases
 RAF Akrotiri in Cyprus: two B.2 squadrons from 1969 to 1975
 9 Squadron 1969–1975, moved from Cottesmore in 1969 it returned to the UK in 1975 to Waddington.
 35 Squadron 1969–1975, moved from Cottesmore in 1969 it returned to the UK in 1975 to Scampton.
 RAF Coningsby: three squadrons from 1962 to 1964
 9 Squadron 1962–1964, formed in 1962 to operate the B.2 it moved to Cottesmore in 1964.
 12 Squadron 1962–1964, formed in 1962 to operate the B.2 it moved to Cottesmore in 1964.
 35 Squadron 1962–1964, formed in 1962 to operate the B.2 it moved to Cottesmore in 1964.

 RAF Cottesmore: three squadrons from 1964 to 1969
 9 Squadron 1964–1969, moved in from Coningsby in 1964, it moved to Akrotiri in 1969.
 12 Squadron 1964–1967, moved in from Coningsby in 1964 until it disbanded in 1967.
 35 Squadron 1964–1969, moved in from Coningsby in 1964, it moved to Akrotiri 1969.
 RAF Finningley
 101 Squadron 1957–1961, formed in 1957 to be the second operational B.1 squadron, moved to Waddington in 1961.
 230 OCU 1961–1969, moved from Waddington in 1961, moved to Scampton in 1969.
 RAF Scampton: four squadrons at different times between 1961 and 1982
 27 Squadron 1961–1972, formed in 1961 to operate the B.2 until it disbanded in 1972. Reformed in 1973 to operate the B.2 (MRR) variant until 1982.
 35 Squadron 1975–1982, moved from Akrotiri in 1975 and operated the B.2 until it disbanded in March 1982.
 83 Squadron 1960–1969, a former B.1/B.1A squadron at Waddington, reformed in 1960 to operate the B.2 until disbanded in 1969.
 617 Squadron 1958–1981, formed in 1958 to operate the B.1, reformed to operate the B.2 in 1961 until disbanded in 1981.
 230 OCU 1969–1981, moved from Finningley in 1969 until disbanded in 1981.
 RAF Waddington: a number of squadrons at different times between 1957 and 1984, it was the first and last operational Vulcan base
 9 Squadron 1975–1982, moved in from Akrotiri in 1975 until it was disbanded in 1982.
 44 Squadron 1960–1982, formed in 1960 to operate the B.1/B.1A, it converted to the B.2 in 1966 and disbanded in 1982.
 50 Squadron 1961–1984, formed in 1961 to operate the B.1/B.1A, it converted to the B.2 in 1966, from 1982 it also flew the tanker version until disbanding in 1984.
 83 Squadron 1957–1960, formed in 1957 to be the first operational squadron to operate the B.1 until 1960, it reformed at Scampton later in the year as a B.2 unit.
 101 Squadron 1961–1982, moved from Finningley in 1961 with the B.1/B.1A, converted to B.2 in 1967 and disbanded in 1982.
 230 OCU 1956–1961, formed in 1956 to train Vulcan crews it moved to Finningley in 1961. A final move to RAF Scampton was made in 1970.

V-Bomber dispersal airfields

In the event of transition to war, the V Bomber squadrons were to deploy four aircraft at short notice to each of 26 pre-prepared dispersal airfields around the United Kingdom. In the early 1960s the RAF ordered 20 Beagle Basset communication aircraft to move the crews to dispersal airfields; the importance of these aircraft was only brief, diminishing when the primary nuclear deterrent switched to the Royal Navy's Polaris Missile.

Accidents and incidents

 On 1 October 1956, Vulcan B.1 XA897, the first to be delivered, crashed at London Heathrow Airport during Operation Tasman Flight, a flag-waving trip to Australia and New Zealand. After a ground-controlled approach in bad weather, it struck the ground  short of the runway just as engine power was applied. The impact probably broke the drag links on the main undercarriage, allowing the undercarriage to be forced backwards and damaged the wing's trailing edge. After the initial impact, XA897 rose back in the air. The pilot, Squadron Leader D. R. Howard, and co-pilot Air Marshal Sir Harry Broadhurst, AOC-in-C Bomber Command, both ejected and survived, the other four occupants (including a spare pilot and an Avro representative) were killed when the aircraft hit the ground again and broke up.
 In 1957, a Vulcan B.1 XA892 attached to the A&AEE at Boscombe Down for acceptance testing was unintentionally flown to an indicated Mach number (IMN) above 1.04, alerting the crew that it had reached supersonic speed. Approaching the target altitude, the throttles were closed and full up-elevator applied, but XA892 continued to pitch nose-down. Cottee contemplated pushing forward to go inverted and then rolling upright; instead, he opened the speed brakes. No sonic boom was reported, so a true Mach number of 1.0 was unlikely to have been  reached. Afterwards, a rear bulkhead was found to be deformed.

 On 20 September 1958, prototype Vulcan VX770 was flown by a Rolls-Royce test pilot on an engine-performance sortie with a flypast at RAF Syerston Battle of Britain At Home display. It flew along the main runway then started a roll to starboard and climbed slightly, during which the starboard wing disintegrated and the main spar collapsed. VX770 went into a dive with the starboard wing on fire and struck the ground, killing three occupants of a controllers' caravan and all four crew on board. Proposed causes of the structural failure have included pilot error, metal fatigue due to air intake vibration, and inadequate maintenance.
 On 24 October 1958, Vulcan B.1 XA908 of No. 83 Squadron crashed east of Detroit, Michigan, USA. The backup system should have provided 20 minutes of emergency power, allowing XA908 to reach one of several airports in the area, but backup power lasted only three minutes due to a short circuit in the service busbar, locking the controls. Bound for Lincoln AFB in Nebraska, XA908 went into a steep dive before crashing, leaving a  crater in the ground, which was later excavated while retrieving wreckage. Despite extensive property damage, there were no ground fatalities and only one hospitalisation. All six crew members were killed, including the co-pilot, who had ejected. The co-pilot's ejection seat was found in Lake St Clair, but his body was not recovered until the following spring. They were buried at Oak Ridge Cemetery in Trenton, Michigan, alongside 11 RAF student pilots killed during the Second World War in accidents at nearby Naval Air Station Grosse Ile.
 On 24 July 1959, Vulcan B.1 XA891 crashed due to an electrical failure during an engine test. Shortly after takeoff, the crew observed generator warning lights and loss of busbar voltage. When it became clear that control would not be regained, Harrison instructed the rear compartment crew to exit the aircraft and the co-pilot to eject, before ejecting himself. All the crew survived, making them the first complete Vulcan crew to successfully escape. The aircraft crashed near Kingston upon Hull.
 On 26 October 1959, Vulcan B.1 XH498 participated in an airshow marking the opening of Wellington International Airport, formerly Rongotai Airport. After a "touch-and-go landing" on Runway 34, it came around for a full-stop landing. Turbulence and wind shear caused XH498 to land short of the runway threshold. The port undercarriage leg clipped the embankment at the Moa point or southern end, damaging wing attachments, engine fuel lines, and the main landing gear drag link, which was ruptured and unable to support the aircraft. The port wing tip nearly scraped the runway surface before it was able to lift off again, spilling fuel over the crowd. Pilot actions prevented a possible disaster as spectators were present on the western apron. XH498 flew to RNZAF Ohakea for a safe emergency landing on just the nose and starboard landing gear with little further damage. A UK repair team returned it to airworthiness; on 4 January 1960, XH498 departed, remaining in service until 19 October 1967.
 On 16 September 1960, Vulcan B.2 XH557 damaged the "Runway Garage" at Filton. XH557 had been allocated to Bristol Siddeley Engines to test the Olympus 301 engine and was being delivered to Filton. Approaching in poor weather conditions, the aircraft touched down halfway along the runway. The braking parachute was streamed, but realising the aircraft would not stop in time, the captain opened the throttles to go round. The Runway Garage took the full force of the jet blast and property damage was sustained; four petrol pumps were blown flat, a streetlight on the A38 was knocked down, railings were blown over, and multiple cars had their windscreens shattered. The aircraft diverted to St. Mawgan, flying into Filton days later.
 On 12 June 1963, Vulcan B.1A XH477 of No. 50 Squadron crashed in Aberdeenshire, Scotland. During a low-level exercise, the Vulcan was flown into terrain. All five crewmembers were killed.
 On 11 May 1964, Vulcan B.2 XH535 crashed during a demonstration. The aircraft entered a spin while a very low speed and high rate of descent were being demonstrated. The landing parachute was deployed, stopping the spin briefly before it began to spin again. Around , the aircraft commander instructed the crew to abandon the aircraft. The commander and co-pilot ejected successfully, but none of the rear compartment crew did so, presumably due to the g forces in the spin.
 On 16 July 1964, Vulcan B.1A XA909 crashed in Anglesey after a midair explosion caused both No. 3 and No. 4 engines to be shut down. The explosion was caused by the failure of a bearing in No. 4 engine. The starboard wing was extensively damaged, the pilot had insufficient aileron power, and both airspeed indications were highly inaccurate. The whole crew successfully abandoned XA909 and was found within a few minutes and rescued.
 On 7 October 1964, Vulcan B.2 XM601 crashed during an overshoot from an asymmetric power practice approach at Coningsby. The co-pilot had executed the asymmetric power approach with two engines producing thrust and two at idle. He was being checked by the squadron commander, who was unfamiliar with the aircraft. When he commenced the overshoot, the copilot moved all the throttles to full power. The engines that had been producing power reached full power more quickly than the engines at idle and the resultant asymmetric thrust exceeded the available rudder authority, causing the aircraft to spin and crash. All the crew perished.
 On 25 May 1965, Vulcan B.2 XM576 crash-landed at Scampton, causing it to be written off within a year of delivery.
 On 11 February 1966, Vulcan B.2 XH536 of IX SQN Cottesmore Wing crashed in the Brecon Beacons during a low-level exercise. All crew members died.
 On 6 April 1967, Vulcan B.2 XL385 burnt out on the runway at RAF Scampton at the beginning of its take-off run. The aircraft was carrying a Blue Steel missile training round. All the crew, including an Air Training Corps cadet, escaped unhurt. The aircraft was engulfed in flames and totally destroyed. The accident was caused by the failure of an Olympus 301 HP turbine disc as the engine reached full power.
 On 30 January 1968, Vulcan B.2 XM604 crashed following a loss of control during an overshoot at RAF Cottesmore. The rear crew members were killed, though both pilots ejected. The captain ejected at a very late stage and only survived because his deploying parachute was snagged by some power cables. The accident was caused by the failure of an Olympus 301 LP turbine disc after the aircraft had returned to the airfield following indications of a bomb-bay overheat.
 On 7 January 1971, Vulcan B.2 XM610 of No.44 Squadron crashed due to a blade fatigue failure in the No. 1 engine, damaging the fuel system and causing a fire. The crew abandoned the aircraft safely, after which it crashed harmlessly in Wingate.
 On 14 October 1975, Vulcan B.2 XM645 of No.9 Squadron lost its left undercarriage and damaged the airframe when it undershot the runway at RAF Luqa in Malta. The aircraft broke up over the town of Żabbar while turning inbound for an emergency landing. The pilot and co-pilot escaped using their ejection seats, the other five crew members were killed. Large aircraft pieces fell on the town; one woman, Vincenza Zammit, was killed by an electric cable, and some 20 others were injured.
 On 17 January 1977, Vulcan B.2 XM600 of No. 101 Squadron crashed near Spilsby, Lincolnshire. During a practice emergency descent, the bomb-bay fire warning light flashed on followed by No.2 engine fire warning light. The captain shut the engine down and the AEO reported flames coming from the area of No.2 engine, just behind the deployed ram air turbine (RAT). As the fire intensified, the captain ordered the aircraft to be abandoned. The cause was due to arcing on the RAT's electrical terminals, burning a hole in an adjacent fuel pipe and setting the fuel on fire.
 On 12 August 1978, Vulcan B.2 XL390 of No. 617 Squadron crashed during an air display at Naval Air Station Glenview, Illinois, in the United States. The crew had been authorized to carry out a display at Chicago's Meigs Field airport; the captain had elected to carry out an unauthorized display at Glenview beforehand. After a low-level run, probably below , the aircraft pulled up for an improperly executed wingover, resulting in a low-level stall and crash, killing all on board.
 On 3 June 1982, Vulcan XM597 broke its probe while attempting to refuel in flight, while returning from a mission over the Falkland Islands. With insufficient fuel to reach its base on Ascension Island, the pilot discarded classified information over the Atlantic Ocean and diverted to Rio de Janeiro. Shortly after entering Brazilian airspace, the Brazilian Air Force sent two Northrop F-5s to escort it to Galeão Air Force Base. This led to high-level diplomatic talks between the UK and Brazil, which remained neutral during the Falklands War. After seven days of detainment, the Vulcan and its crew were allowed to return home on the condition that XM597 play no further part in the conflict.
 On 28 May 2012, Vulcan B.2 XH558 suffered a failure of the two port engines while starting a take-off roll from Robin Hood Airport, Doncaster, UK. Bags of silica gel desiccant had been inadvertently left in the air intake after maintenance. Less than a second after increasing power from 80% to 100%, these were ingested by one of the port engines, immediately destroying it. The remaining port engine ingested debris from the first engine, destroying this one, as well. The fire-prevention systems proved effective, neither the airframe nor control systems suffered damage. The pilot had no difficulty bringing the aircraft to a safe stop, having remained on the ground throughout. On 3 July 2012, XH558 returned to flight.

Surviving aircraft

Several Vulcans survive, housed in museums in both the United Kingdom and North America (USA and Canada). One Vulcan, XH558 (G-VLCN) Spirit of Great Britain, was used as a display aircraft by the RAF as part of the Vulcan Display Flight until 1993. After being grounded, it was later restored to flight by the Vulcan To The Sky Trust and displayed as a civilian aircraft from 2008 until 2015, before being retired a second time for engineering reasons. In retirement, XH558 is to be retained at its base at Doncaster Sheffield Airport as a taxiable aircraft, a role already performed by two other survivors, XL426 (G-VJET) based at Southend Airport, and XM655 (G-VULC), based at Wellesbourne Mountford Airfield. An XJ823 (Avro Vulcan B2) can also be seen at the Solway Aviation Museum at Carlisle Lake District Airport.

Specifications (B.1)

Comparison of variants

Notable appearances in media

See also

References

Notes

Citations

Bibliography
 Austin, Steve. "Workhorse (V-Bombers: Test-bed Vulcan)." FlyPast, No. 335, June 2009, pp. 108–113.
 Baxter, Alan. Olympus: The First Forty Years. Derby, UK: Rolls-Royce Heritage Trust, 1990. .
 Blackman, Tony. Vulcan Test Pilot: My Experiences in the Cockpit of a Cold War Icon. London: Grub Street, 2007. .
 Braybrook, Roy. Battle for the Falklands: Air Forces. Oxford, UK: Osprey Publishing, 1982. .
 Brookes, Andrew. Victor Units of the Cold War: Osprey Combat Aircraft: 88. Oxford, UK: Osprey Publishing, 2011. .
 Brookes, Andrew and Chris Davey. Vulcan Units of The Cold War (Osprey Combat Aircraft: 72). Oxford, UK: Osprey Publishing, 2009. .
 Bull, Stephen. Encyclopedia of Military Technology And Innovation. Santa Barbara, California: Greenwood Publishing Group, 2004. .
 Bulman, Craig. The Vulcan B.Mk2 From a Different Angle. Bishop Auckland, UK: Pentland Press Ltd, 2001. .
 Buttler, Tony. "Avro Type 698 Vulcan (Database)." Aeroplane, Vol. 35, No. 4, Issue No. 408, April 2007.
 Buttler, Tony. British Secret Projects: Jet Bombers Since 1949. Hinckley, Leicestershire, UK: Midland, 2003. .
 Buttler, Tony. "Vital Bombers: Origins of the RAF's 'V-Bomber' Force". Air Enthusiast, No. 79, January/February 1999, pp. 28–41. .
 Darling Kev. Avro Vulcan. North Branch, USA: Speciality Press, 1999. .
 Darling, Kev. Avro Vulcan, Part One (RAF Illustrated). Vale of Glamorgan Wales, UK: Big Bird Aviation Publication, 2007. .
 Dawson, T.W.G., G.F. Kitchen and G.B. Glider. Measurements of the Radar Echoing Area of the Vulcan by the Optical Simulation Method.  Farnborough, Hants, UK: Royal Aircraft Establishment, September 1957 National Archive Catalogue file, AVIA 6/20895
 Fildes, David. "Buck Rogers in the 20th Century: The Origins of the Vulcan." Aeroplane, Vol. 36, No. 3, Issue No. 419, March 2008.
 Frawley, Gerard. The International Directory of Military Aircraft, 2002–2003. Fyshwick, ACT, Australia: Aerospace Publications, 2002. .
 Gallop, Alan. Time Flies: Heathrow at 60. Stroud, UK: Sutton Publishing, 2005. .
 Gibson, Chris. Vulcan's Hammer: V-Force Aircraft and Weapons Projects Since 1945. Crowborough, UK: Hikoki Publications, 2011. 
 Gunston, Bill. "The V-bombers: Avro Vulcan – Part 3". Aeroplane Monthly, Vol. 8, No. 12, December 1980, pp. 620–626. .
 , Bruce Barrymore. Avro Vulcan: The History and Development of a Classic Jet. Barnsley, South Yorkshire, UK: Pen & Sword Aviation, 2006. .
 Hamilton-Paterson, James. Empire of the Clouds: When Britain's Aircraft Ruled the World. London: Faber & Faber, 2010. .
 Hearn, Chester G. Carriers in Combat: The Air War at Sea. London: Stackpole Books, 2007. .
 Jackson, A. J. Avro Aircraft Since 1908, 2nd Edition. London: Putnam Aeronautical Books, 1990. .
 Jackson, Paul. "Vulcan: Delta Force". Wings of Fame, Volume 3. London: Aerospace Publishing, 1996. pp. 34–95. . .
 Jackson Robert. Avro Vulcan. Somerset, UK: Patrick Stephens Ltd, First Edition 1984. Hardback. 
 Jackson Robert. Avro Vulcan. Somerset, UK: Patrick Stephens Ltd, Second Edition 1987. Hardback. 
 Jackson, Robert. Combat Aircraft Prototypes since 1945.  Arco/Prentice Hall Press, 1986. .
 Jackson, Robert. V-Force Britain's Airborne Nuclear Deterrent Shepperton, UK: Ian Allan Publishing, 1986. 0-711-02750-1
 Jefford,C.G. RAF Squadrons:, A Comprehensive Record of the Movement and Equipment of all RAF Squadrons and their Antecedents since 1912. Shrewsbury, Shropshire, UK: Airlife Publishing, 2001. .
 Jenkins, Dennis R. B-1 Lancer: The Most Complicated Warplane Ever Developed. New York: McGraw-Hill, 1999. .
 Jones, Barry. V-Bombers: Valiant, Victor and Vulcan. Ramsbury, UK: The Crowood Press, Paperback edition, 2007. .
 Jones, Barry. "Black Buck – The Swansong." Aeroplane, Vol. 35, No. 4, Issue No. 408, April 2007.
 Kingsley, Simon and Shaun Quegan. Understanding Radar Systems. Raleigh, North Carolina: SciTech Publishing, 1999. .
 Lake, Alan. Flying Units of the RAF: The Ancestry, Formation and Disbandment of all Flying Units since 1912. Shrewsbury, Shropshire, UK: Airlife Publishing, 1999. .
 Laming, Tim. The Vulcan Story: 1952–2002 Enderby, Leicester, UK: Silverdale Books, 2002. .
 Leitch, Andy. "V Force Arsenal: Weapons for the Valiant, Victor and Vulcan". Air Enthusiast, No. 107, September/October 2003, pp. 52–59. .
 Polmar, Norman and Dana Bell. One Hundred Years of World Military Aircraft. Annapolis, Maryland: Naval Institute Press, 2004. .
 Price, Alfred, Tony Blackman and Andrew Edmondson. Avro Vulcan Manual: An Insight into Owning, Restoring, Servicing and Flying Britain's Legendary Cold War Bomber (Owner's Workshop Manual). Sparkford, Somerset, UK: Haynes, 2010. .
 Richardson, Doug. Stealth Warplanes. North Branch, Minnesota: Zenith Imprint, 2001. .
 Seddon, J. and E. L. Goldsmith. Intake Aerodynamics (Aiaa Education Series). Reston, Virginia: American Institute of Aeronautics and Astronautics, 1999. .
 Segell, Glen. Wither or dither: British Aerospace Collaborative Procurement with Europe. London: Glen Segell Publishers, 1997. .
 Stephens, Alan. Power Plus Attitude: Ideas, Strategy and Doctrine in the Royal Australian Air Force, 1921–1991. Canberra, Australia: AGPS Press, 1992. .
 Vulcan B.Mk.1A Pilot's Notes (AP 4505C–PN). London: Air Ministry, 1961.
 Vulcan B.Mk.2 Aircrew Manual (AP101B-1902-15). London: Air Ministry, 1984.
 Wansbrough-White, Gordon. Names With Wings: The Names & Naming Systems of Aircraft & Engines Flown by the British Armed Forces 1878–1984. Shrewsbury, UK: Airlife Publishing Ltd, 1995. .
 White, Rowland. Vulcan 607: The Epic Story of the Most Remarkable British Air Attack since WWII. London: Bantam Press, 2006. .
 Willis, David. "Avro Vulcan survivors." Aeroplane, Vol. 35, No. 4, Issue No. 408, April 2007.
 Wilson, Stewart. Lincoln, Canberra & F-111 in Australian service. Weston Creek, Australia: Aerospace Publications, 1989. .
 Wynn, Humphrey. RAF Strategic Nuclear Deterrent Forces: Origins, Roles and Deployment 1946–1969. London: The Stationery Office, 1997. .

Further reading

 Arnold, Lorna. Britain and the H-Bomb. Basingstoke, Hampshire, UK: Palgrave Macmillan, 2001. .
 Chesnau, Roger and Ray Rimell. Avro Vulcan B Mk 2 (Aeroguide 29). Ringshall, Suffolk, UK: Ad Hoc Publications, 2003. .
 Dodds, Colin. "Flying the Tin Triangle." Aeroplane, Vol. 35, No. 4, Issue No. 408, April 2007.
 Holmes, Harry. Avro: The History of an Aircraft Company. Wiltshire, UK: Crowood Press, 2004. .
 McLelland, Tim. The Avro Vulcan: A Complete History. Manchester, UK: Crécy Publishing Limited, 2007. .

External links

 Avro Vulcan Bomber Tribute Page
 Vulcan to the Sky
 Vulcans in Camera
 Vulcan history
 Vulcan Restoration Trust
 Video of Roland Falk rolling a Vulcan at Farnborough in 1955
 Vulcan Test Pilot Roly Falk history
 Building the Vulcan a 1957 Flight article
 the Vulcan Story Flight article of 1958
 The Virtues of the Avro Vulcan a 1954 AVRO advertisement for the Vulcan in Flight magazine
 The autobiography of Bill Wood a Vulcan test pilot 

 
Vulcan
1950s British bomber aircraft
Tailless delta-wing aircraft
Air refueling
Quadjets
Aircraft first flown in 1952
Low-wing aircraft
Vulcan